The Musqueam flag represents the Musqueam Nation and people. It was designed by Musqueam artist Susan Point, who also helped design the flag of Nunavut. The design of the flag is a white Canadian pale on a teal field, with an arrowhead in the centre depicting a salmon leaping above a net.

The flag was permanently raised on the Vancouver campus of the University of British Columbia during a public ceremony on February 25, 2019. The act was meant to symbolize the university's commitment to furthering their partnership with the Musqueam people, as the Vancouver campus is located on unceded Musqueam territory.

References 

Musqueam
Musqueam
Musqueam
Musqueam
Flags introduced in 2019
Salmon